Luke Boyd (born 22 April 1987 in Sydney) is an Indigenous Australian professional boxer who competes as a featherweight. As an amateur, Boyd represented Australia at the 2008 Olympics, reaching the round of 32 of the bantamweight bracket.

Amateur career
He was named New South Wales's Most Outstanding Boxer in 2006 and in 2007 was awarded an Australian Institute of Sport scholarship. He qualified for the 2008 Olympics, one of three indigenous boxers in the squad, but was beaten 18:8 out by Khumiso Ikgopoleng from Botswana in his first bout.

Professional boxing record

References

External links

Olympic results

1987 births
Living people
Bantamweight boxers
Boxers at the 2008 Summer Olympics
Olympic boxers of Australia
Indigenous Australian boxers
Australian Institute of Sport boxers
Indigenous Australian Olympians
Boxers from Sydney
Australian male boxers